Jorge Luis Visintini (born 8 September 1988) is an Argentine professional footballer who plays as a midfielder for Vélez de San Ramón.

Career
Visintini, after a spell with Tucumán Central, went to Torneo Argentino B with Atlético Concepción. He made sixty-nine appearances and netted six goals in four years, either side of a stint with Mitre in 2013. In 2014, Visintini joined Deportivo Lastenia. Two goals in fourteen games followed, prior to the midfielder agreeing a move to Torneo Federal A with Concepción of Tucumán in 2015. He made his bow in April versus Unión Aconquija, with his first goal coming in a loss to Américo Tesorieri. He featured in fourteen fixtures as they suffered relegation. Visintini split time in 2016 with Unión Santiago and Central Norte.

On 27 January 2017, Visintini agreed to join Deportivo Riestra of Primera B Metropolitana. Eleven appearances occurred as the club won promotion to Primera B Nacional, a competition he subsequently appeared four times in; as they were relegated back down. It was announced that the club would not renew his contract at the conclusion of 2018–19. In 2020, Visintini headed to Vélez de San Ramón.

Career statistics
.

References

External links

1988 births
Living people
Sportspeople from San Miguel de Tucumán
Argentine footballers
Association football midfielders
Torneo Argentino B players
Torneo Federal A players
Primera B Metropolitana players
Primera Nacional players
Club Atlético Mitre footballers
Concepción Fútbol Club players
Central Norte players
Deportivo Riestra players